Fidalgo was a sternwheel steam scow of the Puget Sound Mosquito Fleet.

Career
Fidalgo was built in 1920, and was powered with engines removed from the wrecked or abandoned steamer Northern Light at Seattle.  The vessel was built to haul grain from the La Conner area.  In 1923 the vessel was destroyed in a storm at Seattle.

References
 Newell, Gordon, and Williamson, Joe, Pacific Steamboats, Bonanza Books, New York, NY (1963)

1920 ships
Steamboats of Washington (state)
Passenger ships of the United States